Pallikona (station code: POA), is an E-category Indian Railways station in Guntur railway division of South Central Railway zone. It is situated on the Tenali–Repalle branch line and provides rail connectivity to Pallikona.

History 

It is a part of Tenali–Repalle branch line, which was constructed in 1916 by Madras and Southern Mahratta Railway.

Structure and amenities 
The station has roof top solar panels installed by the Indian railways, along with various railway stations and service buildings in the country, as a part of sourcing 500 MW solar energy.

See also 
 List of railway stations in India

References

External links 

Railway stations on Tenali-Repalle line
Railway stations in Guntur district
Railway stations in Guntur railway division